Typhoon Betty, known in the Philippines as Typhoon Herming, was a powerful and destructive tropical cyclone that struck the Philippines in August 1987. The seventh typhoon and second super typhoon of the active typhoon season, it formed from the monsoon trough that spawned a tropical cyclone on August 8 while around positioned well to the east of the Philippines. It drifted northwestward, becoming a tropical storm on August 9 and a typhoon on August 10. Betty turned westward, where it rapidly intensified before attaining peak intensity on August 11. The next day, Typhoon Betty made landfall in the central Philippines. Betty weakened rapidly over the country, but restrengthened somewhat over the South China Sea. Land interaction weakened Betty slightly before it hit central Vietnam on August 16. The next day, Betty dissipated.

Across the Philippines, Typhoon Betty brought widespread flooding, which resulted in severe destruction. Damage added up to $100 million (1987 USD). In the Maguindanao and Albay provinces alone, 10,000 people were evacuated and 1,000 were homeless. However, the capital city of Manila avoided any serious damage. Nationwide, around 200,000 people were reportedly homeless, 18,000 of winch were from Marinduque and another 11,400 resided on Mindoro Island. In the former, 4,000 dwellings sustained damage, and all of the banana crop there was lost. In all, 25,518 homes received damage. Roughly 400,000 people were directly affected by the storm. Overall, 85 people were killed and 324 others were wounded. After striking the Philippines, six people were killed by Betty in Vietnam. Approximately 10,000 structures were damaged and 103 people were injured. Elsewhere, in northern Thailand, one person was killed and three others were hurt by the typhoon. Several villages were flooded, and numerous streets were damaged.

Meteorological history

The origins of Typhoon Betty can be traced back to a tropical disturbance that was embedded in the monsoon trough on August 7, which extended from the Marshall Islands westward to the Philippines. Following a rapid increase in organization, the Joint Typhoon Warning Center (JTWC) issued a Tropical Cyclone Formation Alert (TCFA) for the system early on August 8. Meanwhile, the Japan Meteorological Agency (JMA) started tracking the system. Around this time, the Philippine Atmospheric, Geophysical and Astronomical Services Administration also monitored the storm and assigned it with the local name Herming. Early on August 9, Betty intensified into a tropical storm about 1,320 km (820 mi) east-southeast of Manila during the morning of August 9.

By the evening of August 9, the JMA upgraded Betty to a severe tropical storm. At 0000 UTC on August 10, both the JMA and JTWC believed that Betty attained typhoon intensity. Tracking westward Betty began an episode of explosive deepening as expected by the JTWC. By 0000 UTC on August 11, the agency upgraded Betty to an equivalent of a Category 4 hurricane. However, the JTWC indicated that the system was considerably stronger, with maximum sustained winds of 260 km/h (160 mph). This concluded the storm intensification period; according to the JTWC, Betty strengthened  in a 37-hour time frame. Furthermore, Betty was the deepest storm of the season, and one of the most powerful storms ever recorded.

At peak, which it maintained for 12 hours, Betty exhibited a small but well-defined eye surrounded by very cold cloud tops. Thereafter, Betty began to weaken as it moved over the central Philippines. Accelerating, Betty continued on a westward track while passing south of a subtropical ridge. Moving west-northwest, Betty began to deepen over open water. Despite this, intensity estimates from the JMA note that Betty did not intensify any further.

After attaining its secondary peak intensity, Betty began to deteriorate as it began to interact with Vietnam. According to the JMA, Betty weakened to a tropical storm on evening of August 16. It then swept across Laos and eventually dissipated over northern Thailand near Chiang Mai during the evening of August 17.

Preparations, impact, and aftermath

Philippines 
Under the anticipation that Betty would strike the Philippines, weather alerts were issued in 11 provinces. Manila was placed on "stage three" alert initially, but after the storm passed south of the city, it was downgraded to "stage two" alert. School classes were suspended and residents in low-lying areas were asked to be ready to evacuate. Warnings urging residents to prepare for the storm were broadcast via television. Eighteen ships were also evacuated. Many radio stations were closed.  Typhoon Betty battered the Philippines at peak intensity, bringing heavy rains while also becoming the deepest tropical cyclone to affect the island nation since Typhoon Ike of the 1984 Pacific typhoon season. It also leveled trees and crops, demolished houses, and knocked down power lines. Many highways, crops, buildings, and homes were destroyed.

Two people were killed in San Pablo; four died in the city of Batangas. Five people were killed when they drowned in when their boat was capsized in the rough waters of the Pacific. One person was missing and five others were injured. In the Laguna province, three people, including a 6 year old boy were killed. In the resort of Tagaytay, many homes lost their roofs. Communication was lost in the Quezon province. Elsewhere, roughly 2,500 individuals were evacuated to shelter in Legazpi, many of whom were houses in schools and churches. However, the metropolis of Manila escaped any major damage, although power was lost in some places. Along the Maguindanao and Albay provinces, 10,000 people were evacuated and crop damage totaled $50,000; in the latter alone, 1,000 families were displaced. Typhoon Betty also destroyed 70 homes on Masbate Island, forcing the evacuation of 412. Five people were also killed on the island. In Marinduque, five casualties occurred and at least 4,000 houses were damaged. There, 100% of all banana and coconut trees were destroyed. The Sorsogon province sustained the worst effects from the storm, where there were 18 fatalities and at least 57,000 homes were demolished. Moreover, 19 people died on Samar Island. Six fisherman were also listed as missing. Along southern Luzon, railway service was suspended and 11 domestic flights in and out of the country on August 12 were cancelled. The next day, Philippine Airlines called off all domestic flights, including three flights each to Hong Kong, Taipei and Tokyo were cancelled. Trading was suspended on the Manila and Makati stock exchanges for a day.

Eighty-five people perished as a result of Typhoon Betty while 17 were reported missing.  Nationwide, around 200,000 people were reportedly homeless, including 18,000 in Marinduque and 11,400 on Mindoro Island. A total of 25,518 homes were damaged. Roughly 400,000 people were directly affected by the storm, 371 of which were injured. Overall, damage amounted to more than PHP 2 billion ($100 million 1987 USD), including $6 million in the provinces of Batangas and Samar. Damage to roads totaled $2.1 million. Following the storm, Philippine President Corazon Aquino declared a state of calamity in more than a dozen provinces. Within a few days after Betty hit, the Philippine Airlines resumed normal flight schedules and schools were reopened. A few months following the passage of Betty, the nation itself was hit by Typhoon Nina.

Vietnam 
After striking the Philippines, six people were killed by Betty in Vietnam. Approximately 10,000 structures were damaged and 103 people were wounded. Several villages were flooded, and many roads were damaged.

See also

Typhoon Nina (1987) — Hit the same area a few months after Betty
Typhoon Son-Tinh
Typhoon Ike
Typhoon Wutip (2013)
Typhoon Nock-ten

Notes

References

External links
Digital Typhoon Archive
Unisys track data

1987 Pacific typhoon season
Typhoons
Typhoons in the Philippines
1987 disasters in the Philippines
Betty